Franky Chan (born 17 March 1965) is a former professional snooker player from Hong Kong.

Career

Born in 1965, Chan turned professional in 1990. Having had experience of competitive snooker in the Hong Kong Masters and the 1988 Kent Cup, he defeated veteran Mike Darrington in the 1990 Professional Play-offs to secure a place as a professional for the 1990/1991 season.

Chan's first season on tour brought him immediate success, with runs to the last 16 at two ranking events, the Asian Open and the Dubai Classic, and to the last-32 stage at the 1991 British Open. In the 1990 Asian Open, held in China, he defeated Jason Smith, David Roe, Wayne Jones and Darren Morgan, before losing 1–5 to Tony Chappel; the Dubai Classic saw victories over Joe Grech, Nigel Gilbert, Cliff Wilson and Jimmy White, but Chan was beaten 2–5 by another senior player, Rex Williams.

In the British Open, Chan was defeated 5–0 by Stephen Hendry; having started the season without a ranking, he finished it 53rd, already within the top 64 who automatically kept their place on tour for the following season.

In the non-ranking 1991 Belgian Challenge, Chan reached the quarter-finals, where he faced White again, and this time lost 0–5; however, only sixteen players featured in the event and Chan had won his last-16 match against Neal Foulds to reach this stage.
Later in the 1991/1992 season, he recorded the best finish of his career when he faced Nigel Bond in the quarter-finals of the ranking 1992 Strachan Challenge. Chan took the third frame with a break of 69, but Bond prevailed 5–1. Chan finished the season ranked 42nd, also a career-best.

The next two seasons saw a sharp downturn in form, and by the end of the 1993/1994 season, Chan had slipped to 118th. That season he had recorded his first and only century break, a 118 in a Grand Prix qualifying match against David Grimwood, but after losing 3–5 to Darryn Walker in qualifying for the 1994 British Open, Chan did not play competitive snooker again. He was relegated from the tour, ranked 310th, in 1996.

References

Hong Kong snooker players
Living people
1965 births